Ribaritsa (also Ribarica, Ribaritza) is the name of two Bulgarian villages:

 Ribaritsa, Lovech Province
 Ribaritsa, Sofia Province